Marthinus or Martinus is an old Dutch or Danish male given name - a latinised form of Martin.

Notable people with this name include:

 Marthinus Bekker (born 1933), South African Navy officer
 Marthinus Jacobus Oosthuizen (1818–1897), South African voortrekker
 Marthinus Otto (born 1980), South African cricketer
 Marthinus du Plessis (born 1932), South African pentathlete
 Marthinus Wessel Pretorius (1819–1901), South African politician
 Marthinus Prinsloo (1838-1903), Orange Free State farmer, politician and commander-in-chief in the Second Boer War
 Marthinus Nikolaas Ras (1853–1900), South African farmer
 Marthinus van Schalkwyk (born 1959), South African politician
 Marthinus Theunis Steyn (1857–1916), South African lawyer, politician, and statesman
 Marthinus Strydom (born 1965), South African investor
 Martinus Thomsen (born 1890), Danish author, philosopher and mystic.
 Marthinus Versfeld or Martin Versfeld (1909–1995), South African philosopher